Alexander Steel Graham (Partick, Glasgow, 2 March 1918 – 3 December 1991, Ticehurst ) was a Scottish cartoonist who created the comic strip Fred Basset.

Biography
Alexander Steel Graham was educated at Dumfries Academy. He studied under William Hutchison at the Glasgow School of Art. During the war he served in the Argyll and Sutherland Highlanders, seeing action in Normandy - two of Graham's war drawings are in the collection of the Imperial War Museum in London. 'Wee Hughie' appeared in 1945 in D C Thomson's Weekly News and ran for twenty years. 'Briggs the Butler' became a fixture in Tatler. Graham drew regularly for Punch and had a series, 'The Eavesdropper,' in The New Yorker. He produced many collections of his cartoons, including 'Graham's Golf Club' and 'Daughter in the House'. Graham's best known creation, Fred Basset, is a comic strip about a thinking basset hound which began in the Daily Mail on 8 July 1963. It has since been syndicated around the world.

Alex Graham died on 3 December 1991 (aged 73).

References

Scottish cartoonists
Scottish comics artists
1913 births
1991 deaths
People educated at Dumfries Academy
British comic strip cartoonists